The Concord Mountains is a group name applied to a complex system of mountain ranges in northwest Victoria Land, Antarctica, comprising the Everett Range, Mirabito Range, King Range, Leitch Massif, East Quartzite Range and West Quartzite Range. It is situated on the Pennell Coast, a part of Antarctica between Cape Williams and Cape Adare.

The mountains were mapped by the United States Geological Survey (USGS) from surveys and U.S. Navy aerial photographs from 1960–63. The name "Concord" was chosen by the northern party of the New Zealand Geological Survey Antarctic Expedition (NZGSAE), which explored the area in 1963–64, in honor of international harmony in Antarctica, and in particular for the fact that five nations participated in the region's exploration.

References
 

Mountain ranges of Victoria Land
Pennell Coast